NetDrive is a drive mapping utility based on WebDrive technology initially developed by South River Technologies and licensed by Novell for distribution with Novell NetWare servers. NetDrive uses the iFolders protocol to map a drive letter on a Windows workstation to a NetWare server. This software's features are: 

Data transfer by drag and drop files in Windows Explorer
Able to execute .exe files including video and audio files
Able to run NetDrive as a system service when Windows starts
Mounts drive automatically on system start
Supports FTP, WebDAV and iFolder.

The software has been discontinued by Novell, and is no longer available from that company.

References

External links
 Novell Documentation: iFolder 2.1 - Novell NetDrive 4.1 User Guide

Internet Protocol based network software